Stražica is a settlement in the Municipality of Vojnik in eastern Slovenia. It lies in the hills northwest of Frankolovo off the main road from Vojnik to Slovenske Konjice. The area is part of the traditional region of Styria. It is now included with the rest of the municipality in the Savinja Statistical Region.

References

External links
Stražica at Geopedia

Populated places in the Municipality of Vojnik